MIRL may refer to:
 Membrane Inhibitor of Reactive Lysis, CD59, a cell surface glycoprotein that inhibits complement-mediated lysis.
 Medium Intensity Runway Lights